Hedeoma is a genus of flowering plants in the mint family, Lamiaceae. It is native to North and South America. They are commonly known as false pennyroyals.

The genus name is derived from the Greek words ἡδύς (hedys), meaning "sweet," and ὀσμή (osme), meaning "odour". It refers to the scent of the leaves. Hedeoma patens M.E. Jones (common name, oregano chiquito) is used by natives of northwestern Mexico to flavor various food items.

Species
 Hedeoma acinoides  Scheele – Slender false pennyroyal - Texas, Oklahoma, Coahuila
 Hedeoma apiculata W.S.Stewart – McKittrick's false pennyroyal - western Texas, southeastern New Mexico
 Hedeoma bella (Epling) R.S.Irving - Jalisco
 Hedeoma chihuahuensis (Henrard) B.L.Turner - Chihuahua
 Hedeoma ciliolata (Epling & W.S.Stewart) R.S.Irving - Gypsum false pennyroyal - Nuevo León
 Hedeoma costata Hemsl. – Ribbed false pennyroyal - Mexico, Guatemala, Texas, Arizona, New Mexico
 Hedeoma crenata R.S.Irving - Rio de Janeiro
 Hedeoma dentata Torr. – Dentate false pennyroyal - Arizona, Sonora, New Mexico
 Hedeoma diffusa Greene – Spreading (or Flagstaff) false pennyroyal - Nevada, Arizona
 Hedeoma drummondii Benth. – Drummond's false pennyroyal - western United States, Alabama, Mississippi, Nuevo León, Coahuila, Chihuahua, Sonora
 Hedeoma floribunda Standl. - Chihuahua
 Hedeoma hispida Pursh – Rough false pennyroyal - Canada, central + eastern United States (especially the Great Plains)
 Hedeoma hyssopifolia A.Gray – Aromatic false pennyroyal - northern Mexico, New Mexico, Arizona
 Hedeoma johnstonii R.S.Irving - Coahuila
 Hedeoma jucunda Greene - Durango
 Hedeoma mandoniana Wedd. - Peru, Bolivia, Jujuy Province of Argentina
 Hedeoma martirensis Moran - Baja California
 Hedeoma matomianum Moran - Baja California
 Hedeoma medium Epling - Argentina, Uruguay
 Hedeoma microphylla R.S.Irving - San Luis Potosí
 Hedeoma mollis Torr. – Softhair false pennyroyal - western Texas
 Hedeoma montana Brandegee - Coahuila
 Hedeoma multiflora Benth - Argentina, Uruguay, southern Brazil
 Hedeoma nana (Torr.) Briq. – Dwarf false pennyroyal - Chihuahua, Texas, New Mexico, Arizona, Utah, Nevada, Mohave Desert in California
 Hedeoma oblatifolia Villarreal - Coahuila
 Hedeoma oblongifolia (A.Gray) A.Heller – Oblongleaf false pennyroyal - Chihuahua, Sonora, New Mexico, Arizona
 Hedeoma palmeri Hemsl. - San Luis Potosí, Nuevo León, Coahuila
 Hedeoma patens M.E. Jones –oregano chiquito - Chihuahua, Coahuila
 Hedeoma patrina W.S.Stewart - Zacatecas
 †Hedeoma pilosa R.S.Irving – Old blue false pennyroyal - Brewster County in Texas but apparently extinct
 Hedeoma piperita Benth. - Hidalgo, México State
 Hedeoma plicata Torr. – Veiny false pennyroyal - Texas, Arizona, New Mexico, northern Mexico
 Hedeoma polygalifolia Benth. - southern Brazil
 Hedeoma pulcherrima Wooton & Standl. – White Mountain false pennyroyal - New Mexico
 Hedeoma pulegioides (L.) Pers. – American false pennyroyal - eastern Canada, central + eastern United States
 Hedeoma pusilla (R.S.Irving) R.S.Irving - Nuevo León
 Hedeoma quercetora Epling - Nuevo León
 Hedeoma reverchonii (A.Gray) A.Gray – Reverchon's false pennyroyal - southern Great Plains (Texas, Oklahoma, western Arkansas)
 Hedeoma rzedowskii B.L.Turner - Aguascalientes, San Luis Potosí
 Hedeoma × serpyllifolia Small - Texas, New Mexico    
 Hedeoma tenuiflora Brandegee - Baja California
 Hedeoma tenuipes Epling - northeastern Mexico
 Hedeoma todsenii R.S.Irving – Todsen's false pennyroyal  - New Mexico

Formerly placed here
Clinopodium glabrum (Nutt.) Kuntze (as H. arkansana Nutt.)
Poliomintha incana (Torr.) A.Gray (as H. incana Torr.)

References

External links

 USDA state-by-state US distribution map of Hedeoma
 Jepson Manual Treatment

 
Lamiaceae genera